The Temple House is a private event space in the South Beach area of Miami, Florida, United States. Designed by L. Murray Dixon, it was once the largest single family residence in the city. The Temple House is frequently used as a location for music videos, including One Direction's "Best Song Ever" and Lumideea and Pitbull's "Crazy".

History

The Temple House, as it is now called, was originally constructed as a two-story single family residence in 1933, with the first stone laid by its architect, L. Murray Dixon, who also designed a number of other well-known Art Deco buildings in Miami Beach. Dixon's work is known and recognized for its use of circles and banding.

In 1942 The Temple House was expanded and re-zoned for the Joseph-Jacob Congregation, which was subsequently renamed Temple Emanuel and eventually moved to a new location in 1965.

In March 2003, The Temple House was purchased by Daniel Davidson, who began renovation work shortly thereafter, preserving the architectural features of the building while installing new electrical, plumbing, and air conditioning systems. Davidson used the house for lavish parties with celebrity guests, and it was also the backdrop to music videos, lectures, feature films, TV-shows and private corporate events.

In 2014, the house was put up for sale at $16.925 million.

Attributes
There is a  mezzanine overlooking the living room. There is also a 2,700 square foot loft office room with kitchen and bathroom, and a 1,100 square foot 2nd floor with kitchen and access to a  sun deck. An outdoor terrace has a swimming pool with three waterfalls. There is also an acoustic and soundproof media room with surround sound and a 100" projection screen.

References

External links
Official site

Buildings and structures in Miami
Houses in Miami-Dade County, Florida
Houses completed in 1933